Jalal Ali "Joe" Kashmiri, better known as Jalal Keshmiri (b. 25 March 1938 – d. 6 February 1999) was an Iranian shot putter and discus thrower. Between 1966 and 1974 he won two gold, three silver and one bronze medal in these events at the Asian Games. He competed in the discus at the 1968 Summer Olympics and placed 20th.

Biography
Keshmiri started as an association football goalkeeper. During one game, a practicing athlete threw a discus that almost hit Keshmiri's head. Angry Keshmiri threw it back and was noticed by the athletics coach. By the age of 19 he switched from football to athletics. In the 1970s he studied physical education at University of Nevada, United States, graduating with a bachelor's degree in 1974. By that time Iranian officials considered him an American citizen and excluded him from the 1972 Olympic team.

After moving to the United States, he went by the name Joe Keshmiri. Keshmiri at age 30 (1968) competed for Nevada college in SP and DT. Competing in the masters division, he briefly held the masters M60 world record in the shot put.  He has held the M60 American record in the discus throw since 1998. He died from cancer in Reno, Nevada, aged 60.

Keshmiri married in Iran in 1965 and had two sons: Kamal (Kamy) and Jamal (Jamy). Kamy became an American discus thrower.

References

1939 births
1999 deaths
Iranian male shot putters
Iranian male discus throwers
Olympic athletes of Iran
Athletes (track and field) at the 1968 Summer Olympics
Asian Games gold medalists for Iran
Asian Games silver medalists for Iran
Asian Games bronze medalists for Iran
Asian Games medalists in athletics (track and field)
Athletes (track and field) at the 1966 Asian Games
Athletes (track and field) at the 1970 Asian Games
Athletes (track and field) at the 1974 Asian Games
Medalists at the 1966 Asian Games
Medalists at the 1970 Asian Games
Medalists at the 1974 Asian Games
20th-century Iranian people